The 2016-2017 season was the club's 68th season in history and their 23rd consecutive season in the top flight of Bosnian football.

Players

Squad

(Captain)

(Captain)

(C)

(C)
(Captain)

(C)

(C)

Statistics

Kit

Friendlies

Competitions

Premier League

Regular season

League table

Matches

Championship round

League table

Matches

Cup of Bosnia and Herzegovina

Round of 32

Round of 16

Quarter-finals

Semi-finals

Final

References

FK Sarajevo seasons
Sarajevo